Frances Spatz Leighton (born Frances Ornstein; September 4, 1919April 6, 2007) was an American author, ghostwriter, and journalist. She ghostwrote several memoirs and accounts of Washington D. C. life, writing over 30 books, including My Thirty Years Backstairs at the White House (1961) and My Life with Jacqueline Kennedy (1969). She was born in Ohio and attended Ohio State University, but did not graduate. Leighton soon moved to Washington, D.C., where she worked as a journalist for several publications, including The American Weekly. She ghostwrote her first memoir in 1957, of a chef for the President of the United States.

Biography

Early life 
Frances Ornstein was born on a dairy farm in Geauga County, Ohio, on September 4, 1919. Her parents were Joseph Ornstein and Bertha Schwartzstein. She had one sister, Rose, who died at age 27, and one brother, Jack, who became a professor of modern languages and linguistics at the University of Texas at El Paso.

Ornstein went to the local Thompson High School, graduating in 1937. Ornstein attended Ohio State University for several years but dropped out shortly before her graduation. While at Ohio State, she was a member of the Verse Writer's Guild of Ohio, hosted a show on the college's radio station and wrote poetry. At the time her goal in life was "to conduct a newspaper, poetry and philosophy column." After dropping out, Ornstein moved to Washington, D.C.

Career 
In Washington, Leighton found initial employment writing as a freelancer for the Metro Sunday Group and other publications. She also worked as a contributing editor to Family Weekly and Washington editor of This Week. Her articles covered topics such as a woman who claimed to have "prayed herself thin", the keeper of the Great Seal of the United States, and a student at Georgetown University who had been a freshman for twelve years. Leighton was working for the International News Service before The American Weekly hired her in 1950. She worked there until the magazine closed in 1958.

The first book she ghostwrote was published in 1957, after The American Weekly gave her an assignment to write a profile of François Rsavy, Dwight D. Eisenhower's chef. Leighton came up with White House Chef which was described as "chatty and surprisingly candid" and selected for preservation in an underground vault by the Library of Congress. In 1959 she collaborated with Jane Barkley, the wife of Alben W. Barkley, to write White House Menus and Recipes.

After working on several books, from 1962 to 1965 she published none, working instead on magazine articles. In 1962 she was the Washington editor of Good Housekeeping and contributing to the Ladies' Home Journal and The Week. By 1969 Leighton had been involved in ghostwriting 16 books. In a profile published that year, The New York Times described her as "one of those people one occasionally meets whose unflagging energy and overwhelming bounce make you feel desperately in need of a nap." It continued to say that she knew "absolutely everything about and everybody in Washington." She told the paper that "I think I'm just hung up on living other people's lives" in response to a question about why she chose to ghostwrite so many books. It took her round three months to write an average book and by 1969 she was approached frequently with requests to ghostwrite memoirs. Around the same time, Leighton began contributing to Mid-South Magazine.

In 1976, she began working to ghostwrite a book by William Miller about his time as Doorkeeper of the United States House of Representatives. The book was published the following year.  She co-wrote with John Szostak In The Footsteps of John Paul II (1980), June Allyson's eponymous memoir in 1982 and a biography of Nancy Reagan, The Search for the Real Nancy Reagan, in 1987.

For the memoirs that she wrote, Leighton earned the nicknames "Queen of Female Ghosts",  "The 'Ghost' of Washington", and "Washington's classiest ghost".

Personal life 
Leighton was married for six years to a staffer for Earle Clements. By 1969, she was described as a "divorcee". In February 1984, she married Kendall King Hoyt (d. 2001), a retired Air Force colonel.

Leighton was an amateur painter and gave lectures in her later life. She died in Arlington, Virginia, on April 6, 2007, aged 87, of heart failure. Her will established a trust to divide money between the town of Thompson and the Ledgemont School District to improve the local library.

Notable works 
Leighton wrote several books of her own and was involved in the publication of over 30 books. She wrote a fictional children's book called The Memoirs of Senator Brown, a Capitol Cat, about a cat who was elected to serve in Congress.

My Thirty Years Backstairs at the White House 
Lillian Rogers Parks worked as a housemaid and seamstress in the White House for around 30 years, from 1921 during the Presidency of Herbert Hoover to 1961 during the Presidency of Dwight D. Eisenhower. Her mother, Maggie Rogers, had worked at the White House in a similar capacity from 1909 to 1939. Leighton worked with Parks to write My Thirty Years Backstairs at the White House (1961) about her experiences working at the White House and as a child while her mother was. After the book's publication, First Lady of the United States Jacqueline Kennedy had her staff sign an agreement to not publish memoirs. The book was very successful, spending 36 weeks on The New York Times Best Seller list, selling over 600,000 copies and spawning a 1979 NBC mini-series, Backstairs at the White House.

I Married a Psychiatrist 
In 1962 Citadel Press published I Married a Psychiatrist. Leighton told the press that the idea for the book came when she was walking her border collie, named "Tiger Lil" and walked by a neighbor who was a psychiatrist. She wrote the book from a story told by Louise Pfister, the wife of Frank Caprio, her neighbor who was a psychiatrist. After meeting Caprio she claimed that his psychiatric advice "changed my life". In 1965 Paramount Pictures announced that it was working on a $2 million movie adaptation of the book, to be directed by George Sidney. Debbie Reynolds was signed to star in the film in early 1966, but the film was shelved after Reynolds got into a fight with the producers.

My Life with Jacqueline Kennedy 
Mary Barelli Gallagher worked as the personal secretary for Jacqueline Kennedy from 1957 to 1964. She wrote a 700-page autobiographical memoir, initially not intending to publish it. When Gallagher decided that she wanted her stories to be published, she approached Leighton through the National Press Club. The two spent around six months revising the manuscript into a 396-page book that was published as My Life with Jacqueline Kennedy in 1969 to generally negative reviews. The New York Times called the book "a worm's-eye view of history commercially packaged by a backstairs ghost" and noted that Gallagher provided "the venom" and "details" to Leighton, who "blended them together with the precision of a hack." Through the process, Gallagher and Leighton became friends and would remain as such until Leighton's death.

Partial bibliography

References 

1919 births
2007 deaths
Ghostwriters
Ohio State University people
People from Geauga County, Ohio
Writers from Ohio